The 1972 Copa Libertadores was the 13th edition of the Copa Libertadores, CONMEBOL's the annual club tournament. Independiente of Argentina defeated Universitario de Deportes of Peru in the finals, and became the second team in the tournament's history to win three title. They would go on and face the winner of the 1971–72 European Cup in the Intercontinental Cup.

Format
The tournament was divided into three phases. The first phase had 19 teams divided into four round-robin groups of four and one group of three (defending champions Nacional received a bye to the second phase). Each group had clubs from two countries. The winners of each group advanced the second phase. Five teams joined the defending champions in two round-robin groups of three. The winners of each group advance to play in the finals. The winner of the finals, and tournament champions, are determined by points (two for a win, one for tie).

Qualified teams

First phase
One team from each group qualified to the second group stage.

Two points were given for a win;
One point was given for a tie;
No points were given for a loss;
Teams in green qualified for the second group stage;

Group 1

Group 2

Group 3

Group 4

Group 5

Second phase

Semi-final A

Semi-final B

Finals

Champion

External links
The tournament on RSSSF
The tournament on CONMEBOL

Copa Libertadores seasons
1